Udolphus is a masculine given name, a variant of Adolphus, and may refer to:

Basil Udolphus Aylmer, 11th Baron Aylmer (1886–1977)
Udolphus Aylmer, 7th Baron Aylmer (1814-1901)
Udolphus Aylmer Coates (1908-2000), British town planner
Udolphus Haron (360-392), fictional duke of Frisia
Udolphus Wright, actor in Mixed Marriage